Saad Khader (born July 3, 1943 ) is a Saudi Arabian television actor, director and producer. He is the first man to present a Saudi film called Maw'id Ma' Majhool. He is considered as one of the greatest Saudi actors of all times.

Career 
Khader started his acting career in 1965, After the opening of Radio Riyadh in 1964, he participated in several programs, in 1965 he joined Saudi TV, in 1969 he participated in serial called secretary in the House, he was presented the first Saudi film called Mowad Ma Majhoal.

Personal life
Khader was born Saad Sadoun Khader Farajallah in Makkah on July 1, 1946. He moved with his family to Riyadh. before starting his career, he was a violinist in the Saudi army, Khader married and has a nine girls and three boys.

Some acting works

Series
Secarty fe al-biat (1969)
Faraj Allah wa zaman (1971)
Ahlam Saedh y hassan (1972)

Movies
Farajallah Karib 1967
 Al-Mozifon (Television movie) with Mohammad Al-Ali
Sarab Al-Ayam  with Samir Ghanem
Mowad Ma Majhoal

References

1943 births
People from Mecca
Living people
Saudi Arabian male film actors
Saudi Arabian male television actors